Mian Kalay (میاں کلے) is a town of Tehsil Alpurai in Shangla District of Khyber-Pakhtunkhwa province of Pakistan. It is the main village of Pirabd Union Council of Tehsil Alpurai and a commercial place for the business community. Mian Kalay is a town of the Pirabad Union Council (U.C) of Tehsil Alpurai, located at 34°54'15N 72°41'45E and lies in the area affected by the 2005 earthquake and 2010 Flood.

References 

Cities and towns in Shangla District